Saiful Iskandar Adha bin Saiful Azlan (born 29 March 1999) is a Malaysian professional footballer who plays as a midfielder for Malaysia M3 League club, Malaysia University.

International career
Saiful Iskandar represented Malaysia under-19.

References

External links
 

1999 births
Living people
Malaysian footballers
UiTM FC players
Selangor FA players
Malaysia Super League players
Malaysia Premier League players
Association football midfielders
Malaysian people of Malay descent